Pyrenaearia poncebensis is a species of small air-breathing land snail, a terrestrial pulmonate gastropod mollusk in the family Hygromiidae, the hairy snails and their allies. 

This species is endemic to Spain.

References

 Mollusc Specialist Group 1996.  Pyrenaearia poncebensis.   2006 IUCN Red List of Threatened Species.   Downloaded on 7 August 2007.
 Bank, R. A.; Neubert, E. (2017). Checklist of the land and freshwater Gastropoda of Europe. Last update: July 16th, 2017.

Pyrenaearia
Endemic fauna of Spain
Gastropods described in 1956